Struthibosca is a genus of biting flies in the family of louse flies, Hippoboscidae. There is only one known species, Struthibosca struthionis (Janson, 1889). It is a parasite of ostriches.

Distribution 
It is found in entire Southern Africa, Uganda, Tanzania, Kenya.

Hosts 
They are only found on ostrich (Struthio camelus).

References 

Parasitic flies
Parasites of birds
Hippoboscidae
Hippoboscoidea genera
Monotypic Brachycera genera